jPod is a 2006 novel by Douglas Coupland.

JPod may also refer to:
 jPod (TV series), a 2008 television comedy series based on the novel
 JPods, a method of personal transportation
 John Podhoretz (born 1961), American writer
 James Podsiadly (born 1981), Australian rules footballer
 J Pod, a community of southern resident killer whales in the northeastern Pacific Ocean